Styphlomerus is a genus of beetles in the family Carabidae, containing the following species:

 Styphlomerus amplus Liebke, 1934
 Styphlomerus aulicus (Dejean, 1831)
 Styphlomerus batesi Chaudoir, 1876
 Styphlomerus burgeoni Liebke, 1934
 Styphlomerus ciliatus Liebke, 1934
 Styphlomerus comoricus (Fairmaire, 1896)
 Styphlomerus cribricollis Chaudoir, 1876
 Styphlomerus equestris (Dejean, 1831)
 Styphlomerus exilis (Laferte-Senectere, 1850)
 Styphlomerus fallax (Peringuey, 1896)
 Styphlomerus flavus Liebke, 1934
 Styphlomerus foveatus Liebke, 1934
 Styphlomerus fusciceps Schmidt-Gobel, 1846:
 Styphlomerus fuscicollis Landin, 1955
 Styphlomerus fuscifrons (Fairmaire, 1897)
 Styphlomerus gebieni Liebke, 1927
 Styphlomerus impressifrons (Fairmaire, 1897)
 Styphlomerus kamerunus Liebke, 1927
 Styphlomerus kisantuus Liebke, 1934
 Styphlomerus kochi Basilewsky, 1959
 Styphlomerus korgei Jedlicka, 1964
 Styphlomerus lamottei Basilewsky, 1951
 Styphlomerus ludicrus (Erichson, 1843)
 Styphlomerus methneri Liebke, 1934
 Styphlomerus montanus (Peringuey, 1896)
 Styphlomerus neavei Liebke, 1934
 Styphlomerus opacicollis (Branicsik, 1893)
 Styphlomerus ovalipennis Liebke, 1934
 Styphlomerus paralleloides Lorenz, 1998
 Styphlomerus piccolo Liebke, 1927
 Styphlomerus placidus (Peringuey, 1896)
 Styphlomerus plausibilis Peringuey, 1904
 Styphlomerus postdilatatus Burgeon, 1947
 Styphlomerus puberulus Peringuey, 1896
 Styphlomerus quadrimaculatus (Dejean, 1831)
 Styphlomerus renaudi Basilewsky, 1965
 Styphlomerus ruficeps Chaudoir, 1876
 Styphlomerus seyrigi (Jeannel, 1949)
 Styphlomerus sinus Alluaud, 1918
 Styphlomerus speciosus Basilewsky, 1949
 Styphlomerus sticticollis (Fairmaire, 1884)
 Styphlomerus tellini Maindron, 1905
 Styphlomerus timoriensis (Jordan, 1894)
 Styphlomerus titschacki Liebke, 1927
 Styphlomerus undulatus (Chaudoir, 1843)
 Styphlomerus vittaticollis (Peringuey, 1885)

References

Brachininae